Julia Ruuttila (1907–1991) was a journalist, writer, and political activist, who wrote stories, articles, and poems under many names, including her maiden name, Julia Godman.

Early life 
Julia Godman was born on April 26, 1907 to Ella Blossom Pardan and John Burwell Godman in Eugene, Oregon. Both of her parents were political activists, socialists, and anarchists. Members of the International Workers of the World, known as Wobblies, also visited their home frequently. Her mother was a feminist and suffragette who brought her daughter to demonstrations and sold birth control, which was then illegal, out of their home.

Godman developed a love of writing from an early age. She was mostly homeschooled, and began a love for imagination and writing. She would become a published author in high school. Her story “The Agate Hunter” and her poem “Brotherhood” were published in the 1924 edition of the Eugenean- her high school’s yearbook. Her activism was present in these early works, with “Brotherhood” containing anti-racist metaphors, and “The Agate Hunter” expressing concerns over becoming a wage slave.

Adult life 
Julia Godman was briefly married to a man named William Clayton Bowen between 1924 and 1925. She then attended the University of Oregon during the 1925-1926 school year. It was here that she would meet her second husband, Maurice "Butch" Bertram. They married in 1926, and in 1927, moved to Chicago, where they had their first son, Michael Jack. They returned to Oregon in 1929, and Butch began working at a sawmill.

In 1943, she divorced Butch Bertam, and married a man named Ben Eaton, only to divorce him in 1946. In 1951, she married for the fourth and final time. His name was Oscar Ruuttila, a Finnish man who worked for the International Longshore and Warehouse Union. The couple moved to Astoria, Oregon. Two years later, her grandson, Shane, and his mother Ella move in with them. Oscar Ruuttila died of a heart attack in 1962, and Julia moved back to Portland. She would later adopt Shane after his father committed suicide.

Julia would stay in Portland and continue her activist work for several decades following. At eighty years old, she moved to Anchorage, Alaska to live with her grandson. She retired from her job at The Dispatcher, the publication for the ILWU. She would also receive honorary lifelong membership in the International Woodworkers of America, which she helped to create. She died in 1991 following a heart attack.

Activism 
Julia Ruuttila spent much of her adult life working for various labor unions and their publications. In 1936, while married to Butch Bertam, her and her husband encouraged the workers of the sawmill at which he worked to unionize. The union left the American Federation of Labor, and became the International Woodworkers of America, joining the CIO. The union was locked out, and Ruuttila, with the help of the women's' auxiliary that she founded, ensured that the workers could support themselves and their families during the lockout.

Also in 1936, she also formed the Free Ray Becker Committee. Ray Becker was a Wobbly that was arrested as a result of the 1919 Centralia Massacre, a conflict that erupted between members of the American Legion and the IWW which killed 6 people.

In 1948, under the pen name Kathleen Cronin, she wrote an article for People's World, a Marxist, leftist publication that called out the Portland Housing Authority and the State Public Welfare Commission for its failures to help the majority black community of Vanport after a flood.

While living in Astoria, Ruuttila worked for the Columbia River Fishermen's Protective Union, created an ILWU Women’s Auxiliary, and a Committee for Protection of Foreign Born. This committee led to her being subpoenaed by the House Committee on Un-American Activities, in an investigation on Communist Political Subversion, despite the fact that she was not a member of the Communist Party.

Following her 1962 return to Portland, Ruuttila served on the Legislative Committee of the Portland Longshore Auxiliary. She also joined a campaign by the Women's International League for Peace and Freedom to stop nerve gas from being moved to a chemical depot in Umatilla. She also opposed the Vietnam War, and encouraged laborers to join the anti-war movement.

Julia Ruuttila was arrested several times. The first time, was during the IWA lockout, and the last time would be in 1975 during a sit-in at a Portland office of Pacific Power and Light, protesting their rising prices.

Writing career

Fiction writing 
Julia Ruuttila wrote profusely throughout her long life. Much of her work is related to her own life, and contain themes of anti-racism, leftism, and class politics. For example, “The Wolf at the Door” is a love story ruined by class differences which is set in the backdrop of a sawmill in the 1930s. Another story, “Joshua’s Daughter: The Story of a Girl who Passed for White” is a story of a biracial woman in 1950s Astoria. She began writing “The Bridges of Ce,” an autobiographical work, while she was fifty. She would never finish. Many of her later stories were fictionalized interpretations of her own life. For example, “Eggs in Baskets” relates to her mother’s illegal sale of birth control, and “Murder in the High Rise” is about an elderly murder victim who wrote for labor publications.

Journalism 
Ruuttila spent a large portion of her life writing for labor publications. In 1936, she began writing for The Timberworker, the newspaper for the woodworkers union that she was involved with. In 1938, she began to write for People’s World, a Marxist aligned publication. She would be fired from this publication in 1948 after writing under the pen name Kathleen Cronin about floods in a mostly black community north of Portland, and the city’s failure to assist them. She worked as a correspondent for a labor and farm news service Federated Press until its closure in 1956. She also began writing for the International Longshore and Warehouse Union's paper, The Dispatcher in 1946, and retired in 1987.

References 

American political activists
20th-century American journalists
Journalists from Oregon
1907 births
1991 deaths